In Between Evolution is the ninth studio album by Canadian rock band The Tragically Hip. It was recorded at Studio X in Seattle and was released June 29, 2004. The album debuted at number one in Canada, selling 22,500 copies in its first week. However, the album got kicked off Canada's number one spot to Avril Lavigne's breakout album. The album was certified Platinum in Canada in September 2004.

One of the major themes of this album is the response to the 2003 invasion of Iraq. "Heaven Is a Better Place Today" doubles as a tribute to Dan Snyder, a player for the Atlanta Thrashers hockey team who died in an automobile accident nine months before the album's release, and for young men being sent to war.

The Hip performed a rough version of the song "It Can't be Nashville Every Night" on a season two episode of Canadian situation comedy TV program Corner Gas, as a local band renting out main character Brent Leroy's garage for band practice.

Track listing
All songs were written by The Tragically Hip.

Cover art
The album cover art was designed by Cameron Tomsett, a Canadian artist from Kingston.

The Tragically Hip
Gord Downie – lead vocals
Rob Baker – lead guitar
Paul Langlois – rhythm guitar
Gord Sinclair – bass guitar, backing vocals
Johnny Fay – drums

References 

2004 albums
The Tragically Hip albums
Albums produced by Adam Kasper
Universal Records albums